Rodrigo Barbosa Tabata (born 19 November 1980) or simply Rodrigo Tabata, is a professional footballer who plays as an attacking midfielder for Qatari club Al Sadd. Born in Brazil, he played for the Qatar national team.

Club career

Career in Brazil
Tabata was born in Araçatuba, Brazil. Earlier in his career, he was a journeyman and played for 11 different clubs between 1999 and 2003. In 2004, he moved to Goiás, playing the Campeonato Brasileiro Série A for the first time. His good performances helped his club finishing in 3rd place in the 2005 edition, the best position Goiás ever achieved in the top flight and qualifying for the Copa Libertadores for the first time in its history.

Tabata was purchased by Santos in 2006, where he won twice the Campeonato Paulista in 2006 and 2007. In 2008, he moved abroad to Gaziantepspor in a three-year loan deal with an option to a permanent purchase.

Gaziantepspor and Beşiktaş

After a successful season with Gaziantepspor, Tabata moved to Beşiktaş for €8 million transfer fee. The transfer caused controversy at Santos as the Brazilian club claimed that they have not received the fee from Gaziantepspor to make the deal permanent before the deal was finished between the Turkish clubs.

Tabata played one full season at Beşiktaş before moving on loan to Al Rayyan in 2010, later being purchased by the Qatari side in 2011.

Al Rayyan

In late 2011, the Al Rayyan administration asked Tabata, who has Japanese grandparents, to obtain a Japanese passport for reasons relating to the foreign player quota of the AFC Champions League. However, Tabata failed the prerequisites as he was unable to write or read the Japanese language.

He received a $100,000 cash award on 8 April 2012 for scoring a super hat-trick (4 goals) against Qatar SC in a league game to give his team an 8–2 win, which was the highest scoring game recorded in the league for the 2011–12 season. He also won the player of the year award in the Qatar Stars League that season, recording 17 goals and 9 assists.

Loan to Al Sadd
On 31 January 2014, he signed a loan deal with another Qatari club and title holders Al Sadd. He returned to Al Rayyan in 2015.

Al Sadd
In July 2020, Tabata signed with Al Sadd for one year.

International career
After years of playing in Qatar, he became a naturalized Qatari citizen and was therefore eligible for the Brazilian and Qatari national football teams. In August 2015, Tabata was selected for the Qatar national team's camp in Austria. His unofficial debut came in a friendly against Austrian club LASK Linz on 17 August 2015. He made his official debut in a FIFA World Cup qualifier match against Hong Kong in a 2–0 win.

Career statistics

Club

International goals
Scores and results list Qatar's goal tally first, score column indicates score after each Rodrigo Tabata goal.

Honours
Santos
Campeonato Paulista: 2006, 2007

Al Rayyan
 Qatar Stars League: 2015–16
 Emir of Qatar Cup: 2013
 Sheikh Jassim Cup: 2012, 2013, 2018

Al-Sadd
 Qatar Cup: 2020, 2021
 Emir of Qatar Cup: 2014, 2020
 Sheikh Jassim Cup: 2014

Individual
Qatar Stars League Player of the Year: 2011–12, 2015–16
Qatar Stars League Top Scorer: 2015–16

References

External links

 santos.globo.com 

 gaziantep27.net

1980 births
Living people
People from Araçatuba
Association football midfielders
Qatari footballers
Qatar international footballers
Qatari people of Brazilian descent
Qatari people of Japanese descent
Brazilian people of Japanese descent
Brazilian footballers
Campeonato Brasileiro Série A players
Süper Lig players
Qatar Stars League players
Qatari Second Division players
Paulista Futebol Clube players
Esporte Clube São Bento players
Esporte Clube Santo André players
Ferroviário Atlético Clube (CE) players
Associação Atlética Internacional (Limeira) players
Treze Futebol Clube players
Ceará Sporting Club players
Esporte Clube XV de Novembro (Piracicaba) players
América Futebol Clube (RN) players
Campinense Clube players
Goiás Esporte Clube players
Santos FC players
Gaziantepspor footballers
Beşiktaş J.K. footballers
Al-Rayyan SC players
Al Sadd SC players
Grêmio Recreativo Serrano players
Brazilian expatriate footballers
Brazilian expatriate sportspeople in Turkey
Expatriate footballers in Turkey
Expatriate footballers in Qatar
Footballers from São Paulo (state)